Finlay is a masculine given name, and also a surname. The given name is represented in Scottish Gaelic as Fionnlagh.

Given name

Finlay
Finlay Mickel, Scottish skier
Finlay Currie (1878–1968), Scottish actor
Finlay Calder, Scottish rugby player
Finlay Freundlich (1885–1964), astronomer
Finlay Crisp (1917–1984), Australian academic and political scientist
Finlay Speedie, Scottish footballer 
Finlay Jackson (1901–1941), cricketer and rugby union player
Finlay Crerar, Royal Air Force Officer
Finlay McNaughton Young (1852–1916), Canadian Senator
Finlay Macdonald (minister), Moderator of the General Assembly of the Church of Scotland
Finlay MacDonald (musician) (born 1978), Scottish bagpiper
Finlay MacDonald (politician, born 1866) (died 1948), Canadian Member of Parliament for Cape Breton South, Nova Scotia
Finlay MacDonald (politician, born 1923) (died 2002), Canadian senator
Finlay J. MacDonald, Scottish journalist
Starsmith, British songwriter and music producer born as Finlay Dow-Smith

Other spellings
Fionnla Dubh mac Gillechriosd, 15th-century Scotsman
Fionnlagh MacCailein (died 1419), Scottish bishop
Findláech of Moray, Macbeth's father

Surname
 Alan Gordon Finlay, (1890–1959), British engineer and inventor
 Alec Finlay (born 1966), Scottish artist
 Alex Finlay (1887–1963), Australian unionist and Senator
 Alexander Struthers Finlay (1807–1886), Scottish Liberal Party politician
 Carlos Finlay, Cuban doctor who first identified mosquitoes as a disease carrier
 Chase Finlay, New York City Ballet dancer
 Charles Coleman Finlay, American science fiction and fantasy writer
 Fit Finlay, Dave "Fit" Finlay, Northern Irish professional wrestler
 David Finlay (VC) (1893–1916), Scottish recipient of the Victoria Cross
 David Finlay (wrestler) (born 1993), German-born Northern Irish-American professional wrestler
 David White Finlay (1840–1923), Scottish physician and yachtsman
 Donald Finlay (1909–1970), British athlete
 Dr. Finlay, fictional character created by author A. J. Cronin
 Erwin Finlay-Freundlich, German astronomer and businessman
 Ethan Finlay, American soccer player
 Fergus Finlay
 Frank Finlay (1926–2016), British stage, film and television actor
 Harold John Finlay (1901–1951), New Zealand paleontologist and conchologist
 George Finlay, British historian of classical and post-classical Greece
 Graham Finlay (1936–2018), New Zealand boxer
 Ian Hamilton Finlay, Scottish poet and writer
 Jack Finlay, Irish hurler and politician
 Jack Finlay (American football), Los Angeles Rams footballer
 Jaco Finlay, Canadian settler in what is now the US state of Oregon
 Katrina Finlay, character in Monarch of the Glen (TV series)
Kirkman Finlay (1773–1842), MP, Provost for Glasgow and leading merchant
Martyn Finlay, New Zealand politician and lawyer
Mary Lou Finlay, Canadian journalist
Ninian Finlay, Scottish international rugby player
Peter Warren Finlay, the birthname of Australian writer DBC Pierre
Richard Finlay (1883–1948), Scottish footballer 
Robert Finlay, 1st Viscount Finlay
Thomas Finlay (Cumann na nGaedheal politician) (1893–1932), Irish Cumann na nGaedhael politician and lawyer
Thomas Finlay (judge) (1922–2017), Irish Fine Gael politician and former Supreme Court Chief Justice
Thomas A. Finlay, Irish Catholic priest, economist, philosopher and editor
Tom Finlay, Irish hurler
Virgil Finlay, science fiction illustrator
William Henry Finlay, South African astronomer

References

Scottish masculine given names